Santiago López-Vázquez (born 18 March 1971) is a Spanish sailor. He competed in the 49er event at the 2000 Summer Olympics.

References

External links
 

1971 births
Living people
Spanish male sailors (sport)
Olympic sailors of Spain
Sailors at the 2000 Summer Olympics – 49er
Sportspeople from Santander, Spain
Sailors (sport) from Cantabria